Ruvand (also Romanized as Rūvānd; also known as Rūvān) is a village in Sagezabad Rural District, in the Central District of Buin Zahra County, Qazvin Province, Iran. At the 2006 census, its population was 80, in 17 families.

References 

Populated places in Buin Zahra County